Adrienne Mercer (born January 21, 1980) is a Canadian curler from St. John's, Newfoundland and Labrador. She currently plays lead on Team Sarah Hill.

Career
Mercer played in the 2009 and 2010 Newfoundland and Labrador Scotties Tournament of Hearts with skip Cindy Miller, failing to qualify for the playoffs on both occasions. She played for Beth Hamilton in the 2012, 2013, 2014 and 2017 editions of the event, however, could not qualify for the playoffs in any of her appearances. She joined Team Sarah Hill for the 2020–21 season.

Due to the COVID-19 pandemic in Newfoundland and Labrador, many teams had to opt out of the 2021 Newfoundland and Labrador Scotties Tournament of Hearts as they could not commit to the quarantine process in order to compete in the 2021 Scotties Tournament of Hearts. This meant that only Team Hill and their clubmates Mackenzie Mitchell's rink entered the event. In the best-of-five series, Team Hill defeated Team Mitchell three games to one to earn the right to represent Newfoundland and Labrador at the 2021 Scotties in Calgary, Alberta. At the Tournament of Hearts, they finished with a 2–6 round robin record, with wins against New Brunswick's Melissa Adams and Nunavut's Lori Eddy.

The following season, the provincial championship was cancelled due to the pandemic. As the highest ranked team on the CTRS standings, Team Hill were appointed to represent Newfoundland and Labrador at the 2022 Scotties Tournament of Hearts in Thunder Bay, Ontario. The team once again finished the national championship with a 2–6 record, beating Nunavut's Brigitte MacPhail and upsetting Northern Ontario's Krista McCarville in their two victories.

Personal life
Mercer is employed as a lawyer at McInnes Cooper. She is married to Michael Crawford and has one daughter, Claire.

Teams

References

External links

1980 births
Canadian women curlers
Living people
Curlers from Newfoundland and Labrador
Sportspeople from St. John's, Newfoundland and Labrador